The Yuba–Donner Scenic Byway is an  National Forest Scenic Byway through the Tahoe National Forest in the U.S. state of California. It consists of the following routes:

Interstate 80 from Emigrant Gap to Truckee
California State Route 89 from Truckee to Sierraville
California State Route 49 from Sierraville to Nevada City
California State Route 20 from Nevada City to Emigrant Gap

References

State Scenic Highway System (California)
National Forest Scenic Byways
Tahoe National Forest
Roads in Nevada County, California
Roads in Sierra County, California
Roads in Yuba County, California
Named highways in California
Interstate 80